Radio Parade of 1935 (1934), released in the US as Radio Follies, is a British comedy film directed by Arthur B. Woods and starring Will Hay, Clifford Mollison and Helen Chandler. It followed on from the 1933 film Radio Parade.

Plot
The film tells the story of the Director General of the National Broadcasting Group (Will Hay), who promotes the ambitious Head of Complaints to Programme Director (Clifford Mollison) in an attempt to stem the number of complaints he is receiving owing to the station's overly intellectual programming. In 1930s British slang, the acronym "NBG" stood for "no bloody good".  The character played by Hay is clearly intended to be a satirical parody of Lord Reith, and the NBG the BBC.

Cast
Will Hay as Director General William Garlon/Garland
Helen Chandler as Joan Garland, the DG's daughter
Clifford Mollison as Jimmy Clare, Complaints Manager
Davy Burnaby as Maj. Gen. Sir Frederick Fotheringhay
Robert Nainby as Col. Egbert Featherstone Haugh-Haugh, 2nd Assistant
Jimmy Godden as Lt. Comm. Vere de V. de Vere, 3rd Assistant
Basil Foster as Capt. Esme St. J. Entwistle, 4th Assistant
Ivor McLaren as Fl. Lieut. Eric Lyttle Lyttle, 5th Assistant
Billy Bennett as The Commissionaire
Hugh E. Wright as Algernon Bird, The Inventor
Lily Morris and Nellie Wallace as Two Charladies
The Western Brothers as Two Announcers
The Three Sailors as Assistants to Complaints Manager
Haver and Lee as Two Effects Men
The Carlyle Cousins as Three Telephonists
Georgie Harris as Chief Page Boy
Gerry Fitzgerald and Arthur Young as Two Window Cleaners 
Claude Dampier as A Piano Tuner
Teddy Joyce And His Band
Alfred Drayton as Carl Graham, Head of the Theatre Trust
Denier Warren as His Personal Assistant
Clapham and Dwyer as Two Reporters

"In Town Tonight":
Eve Becke
Fay Carroll
Peggy Cochrane
Yvette Darnac
Ronald Frankau
Alberta Hunter
Joyce Richardson
Ted Ray
Stanelli And His Hornchestra
The Buddy Bradley Girls
Fred Conyngham
Beryl Orde

Production background and preservation status
Two sequences in the film were filmed in Dufaycolor. The film is extant.

See also
List of early colour feature films

References

External links 
 

1934 films
1934 comedy films
1930s color films
British black-and-white films
Films shot at British International Pictures Studios
1930s English-language films
Films directed by Arthur B. Woods
Films scored by Benjamin Frankel
British comedy films
1930s British films